Cătina may refer to several places in Romania:

Cătina, a commune in Buzău County
Cătina, a commune in Cluj County
Cătina, a village in Floreşti Commune, Prahova County